Events from the year 1650 in Denmark.

Incumbents 

 Monarch – Frederick III
 Steward of the Realm – Corfitz Ulfeldt

Events 

Undated
 Fredericia is incorporated as a market town.

Culture

Art
 Hans Nielsen Bang completes a pulpit for Skeby Church.
 Jørgen Ringnis completes an altarpiece for Torkilstrup Church.

Births 
 June – Princess Wilhelmine Ernestine of Denmark (died 1706 in Germany)
 24 August – Jens Rostgaard, soldier, civil servant, judge and antiquarian (died 1715)

Deaths 
 22 April – Stephanius, royal historiographer and professor (born 1599)
 7 July –  Falk Lykke, nobleman (born 1583)

References 

 
Denmark
Years of the 17th century in Denmark